Leskia is a genus of flies in the family Tachinidae.

Species
These 41 species belong to the genus Leskia:

 Leskia angusta (Walker, 1853) c g
 Leskia arturi Guimaraes, 1975 c g
Leskia aurea (Fallén, 1820) c g
 Leskia aurifrons (Macquart, 1846) c g
 Leskia bezziana (Baranov, 1938) c
 Leskia bibens (Wiedemann, 1830) c g
 Leskia bwambana Emden, 1960 c g
 Leskia certima (Curran, 1927) c
 Leskia darwini Emden, 1960 c g
 Leskia depilis (Coquillett, 1895) i c g b
 Leskia diadema (Wiedemann, 1830) c g
 Leskia erevanica Richter, 1974 c g
 Leskia famelica (Wiedemann, 1830) c
 Leskia flava Townsend, 1911 c g
 Leskia flavescens (Townsend, 1929) c g
 Leskia flavipennis (Wiedemann, 1830) c
 Leskia hirtula (Villeneuve, 1936) c g
 Leskia ignifrons Bezzi, 1928 c g
 Leskia lineata Emden, 1960 c g
 Leskia lineaticollis Emden, 1960 c g
 Leskia longirostris (Villeneuve, 1937) c
 Leskia loriola Reinhard, 1955 c g
 Leskia macilenta Mesnil, 1978 c g
 Leskia miranda Mesnil, 1973 c g
 Leskia occidentalis (Coquillett, 1895) i g b
 Leskia pallidithorax Emden, 1960 c g
 Leskia palliventris Emden, 1960 c g
 Leskia pellucens Curran, 1925 c g
 Leskia penaltis (Curran, 1934) c g
 Leskia pertecta (Walker, 1861) c g
 Leskia pertinax (Curran, 1934) c g
 Leskia pilipleura Mesnil, 1978 c g
 Leskia plana (Walker, 1853) c g
 Leskia pruinosa Emden, 1960 c g
 Leskia sanctaecrucis (Thompson, 1963) c
 Leskia sappirina Mesnil, 1978 c g
 Leskia similis (Townsend, 1916) i c g b
 Leskia siphonina (Villeneuve, 1937) c g
 Leskia taylori Emden, 1960 c g
 Leskia verna (Curran, 1934) c g
 Leskia villeneuvei Emden, 1960 c g

Data sources: i = ITIS, c = Catalogue of Life, g = GBIF, b = Bugguide.net

References

Tachininae
Tachinidae genera
Taxa named by Jean-Baptiste Robineau-Desvoidy